Sir John Armytage, 2nd Baronet (1629–1677) was a British politician.

John Armytage may also refer to:

Jack Armytage (1872–1943), Canadian ice hockey player
 Sir John Armytage, 4th Baronet (1653–1732) of the Armytage baronets
 Sir John Lionel Armytage, 8th Baronet (1901–1983) of the Armytage baronets
 Sir (John) Martin Armytage, 9th Baronet (born 1933) of the Armytage baronets

See also
John Armitage (disambiguation)
Armytage